Heather Mary Hope Brewer-Segal (1931–2006), born Heather Nicholls, was a Bermudian tennis player.

Career
Born in Lancashire, Brewer-Segal grew up on the island of Bermuda. She attended Rollins College in Florida, where she played varsity tennis, before competing on the international circuit through the 1950s and 1960s.

Brewer-Segal, a left-handed player, made the singles semi-finals at the French Championships in both 1955 and 1958, while her best Wimbledon performance was a doubles semi-final appearance in 1954. She twice won the singles title at the South African Championships and was runner-up once. In 1957 she also won the Swiss International Championships at Gstaad. In 1958 she won the Italian Riviera Championships in Sanremo on clay against Mexico's Rosie Reyes. In 1960 she won the Trofeo Conde de Godó (known today as the Barcelona Open) on clay against Pilar Barril.

Personal life
Brewer-Segal had marriages to William Jefferson Brewer (1952) and South African tennis player Abe Segal (1957), which both ended in divorces. During her marriage to Segal she represented her husband's native country.

References

External links
 
 

1931 births
2006 deaths
Bermudian tennis players
South African female tennis players
Bermudian sportswomen
Tennis people from Merseyside
Rollins Tars women's tennis players